Love and Sex with Robots by David Levy, first published in 2007, is a book about the future development of sex robots: robots that will have sex with humans. Levy claims that this practice will be routine by 2050.

Reception
Kathleen Richardson of the  wrote a position paper arguing "that Levy’s proposal shows a number of problems, firstly his understanding of what prostitution is and secondly, by drawing on prostitution as the model for human-robot sexual relations, Levy shows that the sellers of sex are seen by the buyers of sex as things and not recognised as human subjects." She goes on to argue that "[t]his legitimates a dangerous mode of existence where humans can move about in relations with other humans but not recognise them as human subjects in their own right."

References

2007 non-fiction books
Robotics books
Sex robots